The 2013 season is the 101st season of competitive soccer in the United States.

National teams

Men

Senior

Goal scorers

Under-20

Under-18

Under-17

Women

Senior

Under-23

Under-20

Under-17

American club leagues

Major League Soccer 

The Major League Soccer season began on March 2, 2013, following preseason events in Tucson, Arizona, Orlando, Florida, and Charleston, South Carolina. The regular season ended on October 27, 2013.

Conference tables 

Eastern Conference

Western Conference

Overall table

2013 MLS Cup Playoffs

North American Soccer League 

The North American Soccer League has been split into spring and fall tournaments for the 2013 season, similar to the Apertura and Clausura league system commonly found in Mexican and Central American soccer leagues. The winner of the Spring season will host the winner of the Fall season in the 2013 Soccer Bowl championship. The Spring season will begin on April 6, 2013. The Fall season will begin on August 3, 2013.

Spring Season

Fall Season 
The New York Cosmos will join the league during the Fall season. Puerto Rico Islanders, originally planned to take part in this season, announced taking one year off due to restructuring.

Soccer Bowl 2013 
Soccer Bowl 2013 was contested by the winners of the spring and fall seasons. The game was hosted by the winner of the spring season.

USL Pro 

For the first time, all USL Pro teams will play every other team in a home-and-away arrangement, like most European leagues. The only exception will be Antigua Barracuda FC, which will play all their matches on the road, giving every other team 13 home matches against other USL Pro teams.

On January 23, 2013, USL Pro announced an alliance with Major League Soccer. For the 2013 season, four MLS teams will affiliate with USL Pro teams in lieu of participating in the MLS Reserve League system. These MLS clubs will loan at least four of their reserve players to their USL Pro affiliate club for development purposes.

All USL Pro teams will play two matches each with the remaining MLS Reserve League teams. Those matches will count toward USL Pro standings, giving each team a total of 26 games.

The following teams will affiliate:

Sporting Kansas City — Orlando City Soccer Club
New England Revolution — Rochester Rhinos
D.C. United — Richmond Kickers
Philadelphia Union — Harrisburg City Islanders

USL Pro teams will play MLS Reserve teams as listed below. Except for Antigua Barracuda FC (who will play two MLS reserve teams on the road), each set will be a home-and-away arrangement.

Antigua Barracuda FC — FC Dallas and San Jose Earthquakes
Charleston Battery — Houston Dynamo
Charlotte Eagles — Chicago Fire
Dayton Dutch Lions — Columbus Crew
Harrisburg City Islanders — Colorado Rapids
Los Angeles Blues — Los Angeles Galaxy
Orlando City — Seattle Sounders FC
Pittsburgh Riverhounds — Toronto FC
Phoenix FC — Real Salt Lake
Richmond Kickers — Vancouver Whitecaps FC
Rochester Rhinos — Montreal Impact
VSI Tampa Bay FC — Portland Timbers
Wilmington Hammerheads — New York Red Bulls

The USL Pro season will begin on March 23, 2013. The first matches with MLS Reserve League teams will take place on April 7, 2013.

Overall table

USL Pro playoffs

USL Pro Championship

National Women's Soccer League 

The inaugural NWSL season began on April 13 and concluded on August 18. The Portland Thorns won the first NWSL Championship, defeating NWSL Shield winner Western New York Flash 2–0 on August 31.

Overall table

NWSL playoffs

NWSL Championship

US Open Cup 

The 100th edition of the annual national championship, the 2013 Lamar Hunt U.S. Open Cup, ran from May 7 through October 2. Sporting Kansas City, the defending champions, were eliminated in the fourth round (round of 16) by USL Pro side Orlando City.

D.C. United defeated Real Salt Lake 1–0 in the final to qualify for the 2014–15 CONCACAF Champions League Group Stage.

Honors

Professional

Amateur

American clubs in international competition

2012–13 Champions League

Houston Dynamo

Los Angeles Galaxy

Seattle Sounders FC

2013–14 Champions League

Houston Dynamo

LA Galaxy

San Jose Earthquakes

Sporting Kansas City

References

 
Seasons in American soccer